Eddie Murphy is an American actor, comedian, singer, producer and screenwriter. The following is his complete discography.

Albums

Studio albums

Live comedy albums

Compilation albums

Singles

References

Discographies of American artists
Comedian discographies
Discography